Wham! (briefly known in the US as Wham! U.K.) were  an English pop duo formed in Bushey in 1981. The duo consisted of George Michael and Andrew Ridgeley. They became one of the most commercially successful pop acts of the 1980s, selling more than 30 million certified records worldwide from 1982 to 1986.

Influenced by funk and soul music and presenting themselves as disaffected youth, Wham!'s 1983 debut album Fantastic addressed the United Kingdom's unemployment problem and teen angst over adulthood. Their second studio album Make It Big in 1984 was a worldwide pop smash hit, charting at number one in both the UK and the United States. Associated with the MTV-driven Second British Invasion of the US, the singles from the album—"Wake Me Up Before You Go-Go", "Everything She Wants" and "Careless Whisper"—all topped the US Billboard Hot 100. In 1985, Wham! made a highly publicised 10-day visit to China, the first by a Western pop group. The event was seen as a major watershed moment in increasing friendly bilateral relations between China and the West.

In 1986, Wham! broke up. Michael was keen to create music targeted at a more sophisticated adult market rather than the duo's primarily teenage audience. Before going their separate ways, a farewell single "The Edge of Heaven", and a greatest-hits album titled The Final would be forthcoming, along with a farewell concert entitled The Final.

History
Michael and Ridgeley met at Bushey Meads School in Bushey near the town of Watford in Hertfordshire. The two at first performed in a short-lived ska band called The Executive, alongside former school friends David (Austin) Mortimer, Andrew Leaver, Tony Bywaters, Harry Tadayon and Paul Ridgeley. When this group split, Michael and Andrew Ridgeley eventually formed Wham!

Ridgeley explained that the name originated from a need for "something that captured the essence of what set us apart – our energy and our friendship – and then it came to us: Wham! Wham! was snappy, immediate, fun and boisterous too." British graphic design studio Stylorouge was credited with adding the exclamation mark to the name of the band.

Ridgeley and Michael worked persistently to get their feet in the door with recording executives. Ridgeley would frequently run into Mark Dean from Innervision Records at The Three Crowns in Hertfordshire, and hand him the band's demo tape.

In February 1982, Dean met with Michael and Ridgeley and offered them a recording deal. "I'm going to offer Wham! a deal with my new label Innervision," Dean said. "It's not a huge thing, I'm taking a punt. I'd like you to have a crack at recording a single or two and we'll see what happens from there."

Initially the pair wrote songs such as "Wham Rap (Enjoy What You Do)" and "Club Tropicana" together, but part way through the recording of their debut album Fantastic, the pair agreed that Michael was the stronger songwriter, and would take creative control. Still teenagers, they promoted themselves as hedonistic youngsters, proud to live a carefree life without work or commitment. This was reflected in their earliest singles which, part-parody, part-social comment, briefly earned Wham! a reputation as a dance protest group.

The debut record to be released by the band was "Wham Rap!" in June 1982. It was a double A-side including the Social Mix and the Unsocial Mix. The record was not playlisted by BBC Radio 1 in the UK, partly because of the profanity in the Unsocial Mix. The song charted at only No. 105.

In October 1982, "Young Guns (Go for It)" was issued. Initially, it also stalled outside the UK top 40 but the band got lucky when the BBC programme Top of the Pops scheduled them after another act unexpectedly pulled out of the show.

Increasing success
Wham!'s first manager was Bryan Morrison. The effect of Wham! on the public was felt from the moment they finished their debut performance of "Young Guns (Go for It)" on Top of the Pops. Michael wore espadrilles, an open suede jacket, and rolled-up denim jeans. Ridgeley stood behind him, flanked by backing dancers Dee C. Lee and Shirlie Holliman. Afterwards, the song shot into the top 40 at No. 24 and peaked at No. 3 in December. The following year (1983), Dee C. Lee began her work with Paul Weller in the Style Council, and was replaced by Helen 'Pepsi' DeMacque. Holliman and DeMacque would later record as Pepsi & Shirlie.

Wham! followed up "Young Guns (Go for It)" with a reissue of "Wham Rap (Enjoy What You Do)", "Bad Boys" and "Club Tropicana". By the end of 1983, Wham! were competing against pop rivals Culture Club and Duran Duran as one of Britain's biggest pop acts. Their debut album Fantastic spent two weeks at No. 1 in the UK album charts in 1983, but the album achieved only modest success in the US.

Legal disputes with Innervision
Soon after this, Ridgeley became conscious of legal problems with their initial contract at Innervision. While the legal battle raged, Innervision released a medley of non-single album tracks from Fantastic, entitled "Club Fantastic Megamix". Wham! publicly denounced the release. After all the legal wrangling, Innervision settled out of court.

Switch to Epic and continued success
Now signed to Epic Records, except in the US and a few other countries on Epic's sister label Columbia Records, Wham! returned in 1984 with a new album and an updated pop image. These changes helped to propel Wham!'s next single, "Wake Me Up Before You Go-Go", into the top ten of several countries around the world. It became their first US and UK No. 1 single, accompanied by a video of the duo with Pepsi and Shirlie, all wearing Katharine Hamnett T-shirts with the slogans "CHOOSE LIFE" and "GO GO".

The next single from the Wham! album was "Careless Whisper", but it featured only George Michael in the music video. In certain markets, the single was promoted as "Wham! featuring George Michael", and in other markets, it was credited to only George Michael as a solo act but, unlike any Wham! single except "Wham Rap!" and "Club Tropicana", it was also co-written with Andrew Ridgeley. The song, about a remorseful two-timer, had more emotional depth than previous releases. It reached No. 1, selling over 1.3 million copies in the UK. "Careless Whisper" marked a new phase in Michael's career, as his label Columbia/Epic began to somewhat distance him from the group Wham!'s playboy image.

The next single was "Freedom" and was simply promoted as a Wham! single. Wham! used a video edited together from footage of their tour in China for "Freedom"'s US single release. Their second album, Make It Big, climbed to No. 1 on the album charts and the band set off on an arena tour at the end of 1984.

The double A-side single "Last Christmas/Everything She Wants" became the highest-selling single ever to peak at No. 2 in the UK charts. It stayed at No. 2 for five weeks and, as of February 2020, was the 10th best-selling single of all time in the United Kingdom, selling over 1.9 million copies in the UK. Wham! donated all their royalties from the single to the Ethiopian famine appeal to coincide with the fund-raising intentions of Band Aid's "Do They Know It's Christmas?", the song which kept them out of the top spot. Nevertheless, Band Aid's success meant that Michael had achieved #1 status in the UK within three separate entities in 1984—as a solo artist, as one half of a duo, and as part of a charity ensemble.

At the end of 1985, the US Billboard charts listed "Wake Me Up Before You Go-Go" as the number-three song and "Careless Whisper" as the number-one song of the year.

China (1985)
In March 1985, Wham! took a break from recording to embark on a lengthy world tour, including a ground-breaking 10-day visit to China, the first by a Western pop group. The China excursion was a publicity scheme devised by Simon Napier-Bell (one of their two managers; Jazz Summers being the other). It began with a concert at the Peoples' Gymnasium in Beijing in front of 12,000 people. They also played a concert in front of 5,000 in Canton. The two concerts were played without compensation. Wham!'s visit to China attracted huge media attention across the world. Napier-Bell later admitted that he used cunning tactics to sabotage the efforts of rock band Queen to be the first to play in China: he made two brochures for the Chinese authorities; one featuring Wham! fans as pleasant middle-class youngsters and one portraying Queen lead singer Freddie Mercury in typically flamboyant poses. The Chinese opted for Wham!.

British director Lindsay Anderson was engaged to accompany Wham! to China and make a documentary film about the visit. Anderson called his one-hour and 18 minute film If You Were There.
In the final stages of editing, Anderson was dismissed by Wham!'s management, the editing team quit, and the film was re-edited, renamed and released as Wham! in China: Foreign Skies. According to a 2006 interview with The Independent, Andy Stephens, manager for Michael, said that the film [Anderson's version] was simply not good enough to be shown in public: "It's a dreadful film ... It's 20 years old and it's rubbish. Why on earth should we allow it to be shown?", although after viewing it in 2008 critic and journalist John Harris described it as "a rich, poetic, panoramic portrait of China's strangeness to the eyes of outsiders".

Live Aid (1985)
Sporting a beard, Michael appeared with Ridgeley onstage at Live Aid on 13 July 1985 (although they did not perform as Wham!). Michael sang "Don't Let the Sun Go Down on Me" with Elton John, while Ridgeley joined Kiki Dee in the row of backing singers. In September, Wham! released the single "I'm Your Man" which went to No. 1 in the UK charts.

Around this time, Ridgeley began a relationship with Keren Woodward of Bananarama, and also took up the hobby of rally driving. "Last Christmas" was re-issued for the festive season and again made the UK Top 10, peaking at No. 6, while Michael took up offers he was starting to receive to add his voice to other artists' songs. He performed backing vocals for David Cassidy, and also for Elton John on his successful singles "Nikita" (UK No. 3) and "Wrap Her Up" (UK No. 12), on which he sang co-lead vocals.

Breakup (1986)
Michael was keen to create music targeted at a more sophisticated adult market rather than the duo's primarily teenage audience, and therefore, he and Ridgeley officially announced the breakup of Wham! in the spring of 1986. Before going their separate ways, a farewell single "The Edge of Heaven", and a greatest hits album titled The Final would be forthcoming, along with a farewell concert entitled The Final. Announcing the breakup, Michael said: "I think it should be the most amicable split in pop history."

The farewell single reached No. 1 in June 1986. "Where Did Your Heart Go?" was the group's final single in the United States. The song, originally recorded by Was (Not Was), was a gloomy and sombre affair. The duo's last release was a double-LP collection of all the singles to date, including some extended versions. This was released in North America as the severely pared-down Music from the Edge of Heaven with alternate tracks.

At London's Wembley Stadium on 28 June 1986, Wham! bid goodbye to their fans and each other with an emotional embrace at the end of its final concert. 72,000 people attended the eight-hour event, which included support artists, on a scorching hot day in London. The duo had been together for five years, selling over 28 million records and 15 million singles. Foreign Skies, the documentary of their tour of China, received its world premiere as part of the festivities.

Post-Wham! and Michael's death
For several years after becoming a solo artist, Michael spoke negatively, in public, about his time with Wham!, partly because of the negativity of intense media coverage on Ridgeley. Michael complained of the constant pressure he felt, and he claimed that the duo had been mistreated financially. He also spoke disparagingly about some of the videos and songs from the Wham! repertoire, especially the video from "Wake Me Up Before You Go-Go", and the songs from Fantastic. However, his perspective on the era softened somewhat in the later years of his life. At his solo concerts he would still perform "I'm Your Man" and "Everything She Wants", the latter being one of the more critically acclaimed songs from the Wham! era.

Andrew Ridgeley moved to Monaco after Wham!'s breakup and tried his hand at Formula Three motor racing. Meeting with little success, Ridgeley moved to Los Angeles to pursue his singing/acting career, the failure of which caused him to return to England in 1990. Regardless, CBS Records, having taken up the option on Wham!'s contract that specified solo albums from Michael and Ridgeley, released a solo effort from Ridgeley, Son of Albert, in 1990. After poor sales, CBS declined the option of a second album. On 25 June 1988, George Michael's 25th birthday, Michael played the third of three dates at Birmingham's NEC as part of the Faith World Tour. He appeared deeply moved when he was surprised on stage by many members of his family with Andrew Ridgeley, who was pushing a trolley carrying a huge birthday cake. They led the 13,000-strong crowd in a rendition of "Happy Birthday" before Ridgeley accompanied Michael in a performance of "I'm Your Man".

In January 1991, Ridgeley joined Michael on stage for a few songs at the encore of his performance at the Rock in Rio event at the Maracanã Stadium in Rio de Janeiro, Brazil. On 21 November 2009, there was a Wham!-themed night on television's The X Factor in the UK. Michael later appeared on the show's final episode, performing a duet of "Don't Let the Sun Go Down on Me" with finalist and eventual winner Joe McElderry. In 2012, Michael said that there was no truth in speculation that he and Ridgeley were set for a Wham! reunion to mark the 30th anniversary of the group's first album.

Michael died from heart and liver disease at his home in Goring-on-Thames, Oxfordshire on Christmas Day 2016. He was 53. Upon hearing of Michael's death, Ridgeley paid his respects on Twitter, saying, "Heartbroken at the loss of my beloved friend Yog."

Discography 

 Fantastic (1983)
 Make It Big (1984)
 Music from the Edge of Heaven (1986)

Selected filmography 

Documentaries and filmed performances
 Wham! in China: Foreign Skies (1986)

Concert tours 

1983
 Club Fantastic Tour

1984–85
 The Big Tour

1985
 Whamamerica!

1986
 The Final

References

External links

Official website of George Michael
George Michael Concert Archive
Wham! at Rolling Stone

English pop music duos
Brit Award winners
Musical groups established in 1981
Musical groups disestablished in 1986
People from Bushey
Musical groups from Hertfordshire
Columbia Records artists
Epic Records artists
Innervision Records artists
Sony Music UK artists
1981 establishments in England
1986 disestablishments in England
Male musical duos
Second British Invasion artists